Elías Nicolás Rodríguez Zavaleta (born 22 July 1974) is a Peruvian lawyer and politician belonging to the Peruvian Aprista Party. He was a former Congressman representing La Libertad region from 2006 until the dissolution of Congress by President Martín Vizcarra in 2019. Since 2017, he serves as the Institutional Secretary General of the Peruvian Aprista Party.

Biography 
He completed his secondary studies at the José Faustino Sánchez Carrión School, and graduated from the Faculty of Law and Political Sciences of the Antenor Orrego University of Trujillo.

Political career

Early political career 
From 1990 to 1991, as a student of the Antenor Orrego Private University, Elías Rodríguez was the Secretary of Culture of the Aprista Party's youth wing (Juventud Aprista Peruana) on a regional level. Since 1996 he holds a Licentiate degree in law. From 1998 to 2002 he worked as an external legal advisor to the Trujillo provincial municipality. In the 2000 elections, he ran for a seat in the Congress under the Peruvian Aprista Party, but he was not elected. Two years later, in the 2002 municipal elections, Rodríguez ran for a seat in the Provincial Council of Trujillo, and was elected provincial councillor for a four-year term. He served as provincial councillor until he was elected Congressman in the 2006 elections.

Congressman 
In the 2006 election, he was elected Congressman representing La Libertad for the 2006–2011 term under the Peruvian Aprista Party. In the 2011 election, he was re-elected for another five-year term. In the 2016 election, he was re-elected for another five-year term under the Popular Alliance, which consisted of the APRA, PPC and VP, but his term was cut short by the dissolution of Congress by President Martín Vizcarra in September 2019.

Party politics 
Since 2017, he has been serving as the Institutional Secretary General of the Peruvian Aprista Party. He was reelected to the position by the XXV National Convention "Alan García", held on October 25 to 27, 2019.

References

External links

Official Congressional Site
Resume on the National Electoral Committee's site (JNE) site

Living people
American Popular Revolutionary Alliance politicians
Members of the Congress of the Republic of Peru
1974 births
People from Santiago de Chuco Province
People from La Libertad Region
20th-century Peruvian lawyers